Bunzō, Bunzo, Bunzou or Bunzoh (written:  or ) is a masculine Japanese given name. Notable people with the name include:

, Japanese botanist
, Japanese rower
, a Japanese author and journalist. 

Japanese masculine given names